This is a list of some of the works by the French artist Alexandre Falguière.

Biography 
Falguière was born in Toulouse on 7 September 1831 into a modest home, his father working as a mason. His father did, however manage to put him into the Toulouse École des Beaux-Arts where he studied both painting and sculpture and in 1853 was awarded the Toulouse municipal prize for sculpture, which allowed him to study at the Beaux-Arts in Paris, with Toulouse making a contribution towards payment of his fees and expenses. Once he arrived in Paris he worked in the studio of Albert-Ernest Carrier-Belleuse so that he could earn some extra cash to supplement the Toulouse funds and then moved to Jean-Louis Chenillon's studio. In 1854 he finally entered the École des Beaux-Arts and there won the Prix de Rome in 1859. He was then 23 years of age, so very near the Prix de Rome age limit. Winning this prestigious prize not only gave him a welcome bursary and access to further funds, but allowed him to travel to and study in Rome and whilst there he executed several pieces. The first piece he sent back to France was a bas-relief entitled "Des Joueurs de cerceau" and then "Thésée enfant", a work in marble and his first work accepted by the Salon. He also completed in Rome the work "Omphale" worked in marble, and "Nuccia la trastecerina". both of which made the Salon, the latter being purchased by the State. It was however his 1864 submission to the Salon called "le Vainqueur au combat de coqs" which was to make his reputation. When he returned to Paris from Rome in 1867, his work was already well known and highly regarded and he sealed this with his Salon submission "Tracisius". Now from his small studio in the rue de l'Ouest, later called the rue d'Assas, he produced work after work. In 1868 he was awarded the Medal of Honour at the Paris Salon and was appointed Officer of the Légion of Honor in 1878, in 1889 becoming a "commandeur" of that order. He had been made a member of the Académie française in 1882 and in the same year was made professor at the École des Beaux-arts. In 1870, with Paris under siege by the Prussian army, Alexandre Falguière enrolled in the National Guard and it was at this time that he made a sculpture from snow called "La Résistance" a work celebrated by the poets Théodore de Banville and Théophile Gautier, both fellow members of the guard. The 1880s saw a huge demand for statues, France being gripped by "statuomanie" and Falguière was swamped by commissions. By the end of his life Falguière was running five studios and had many pupils including Idrac, Injalbert, Marqueste, Théodore-Rivière and Antonin Mercié. His output was prolific, many of his compositions being repeated in various materials and sizes. Many of his original plaster works were cast in bronze or sculpted in marble so that the same work can be seen in various locations, albeit in different materials and of different dimensions and many of his maquettes are preserved in museums.

From 8 February to 8 March 1902, a major exhibition of Falguière's work was held at the École National des Beaux-Arts in Paris and Falguière's widow asked G Larroumet, a long time friend of Falguière and permanent secretary of the École, to write a preface in the exhibition catalogue. We are fortunate that this can be read on-line and some of the information in the catalogue is used in this article.

Early works

Works located in Paris

Works in Musée d'Orsay

There are many Falguiere works in Paris' Musée d'Orsay. These include:

 The wrestlers

An 1875 painting.

 Eve

This composition depicting Eve and a serpent was completed around 1880. The museum hold a plaster version. A large version in marble was shown at the Paris Salon of 1880 and this is now held in Copenhagen's Ny Carlsberg Glyptotek.

 Baronne Daumesnil

This marble bust dates to 1879. The Musée d'Orsay also hold the plaster model and a version in terracotta can be seen in the Musée of Périgord, Périgueux, and a bronze version is held by Bayonne's Musée Bonnat. The work has two inscriptions: "DONNE A LA FRANCE PAR SA PETITE FILLE / LA VICOMTESSE THERESE DE CLAIRVAL NEE MORIZOT" and "ANNE FORTUNEE LEONIE GARAT BARONNE DAUMESNIL / SURINTENDANTE DE LA LEGION D'HONNEUR".
Until 1891 the work was held in the collection of the Vicomtesse Thérèse de Clairval, née Morizot and was then presented as a gift to the French nation.
From 1891 to 1916 it was held by the Musée du Luxembourg in Paris, and from 1916 to 1956 was held by the Musée du Louvre, Paris.  In 1986 it was taken into the Musée d'Orsay.

 La danseuse

A marble version was shown at the Salon in 1896 and at the 1902 Falguière retrospective

 Bust of Léon Gambetta 

Thought to date to around 1895, this bronze bust of Léon Gambetta was cast by Thiébaut.  The Musée d'Orsay also hold the version in terracotta dating to 1882. Other terracotta versions are to be found in the Musée Granet in Aix-en-Provence and the Musée Carnavalet in Paris and another Thiébaut bronze is to be seen in the Musée de Picardie in Amiens.  There is a bronze cast by Bingen in the Indiana University museum, Bloomington and Sèvres brought out a biscuit version.  A marble version is in the Palais du Sénat in Paris and there are of course the full scale monuments to Gambetta in Cahors and Saïgon.

 Bust of woman entitled "Pompadour"

A wax version of this Falguière piece can be seen in the Petit Palais in Paris held under the title "Mme X dans le goût du XVIIIe", and Sèvres sold a biscuit version from 1907 to 1941 under the name "La Pompadour".

 Saint Vincent de Paul

This work in marble is thought to date to 1879 when it was shown at the Salon de la Société des artistes français. It was then shown at the Paris Exposition of 1883.  The foundry Thiébaut cast a bronze version and another of just the bust.  On the pedestal of this marble work the inscription reads: :St VINCENT DE PAUL/1591-1660/APOTRE DE LA CHARITÉ/CURÉ DE CLICHY/1612-1625"
The sculpture was held from 1879 to 1944 in the Panthéon in Paris, then by the Église de Saint-Médard in Clichy until 1986 when it was passed to the Musée d'Orsay.

 Pégase emportant le poète vers les régions du rêve

Falguière executed this work depicting Apollon riding on Pégase between 1880 and 1897 and the Musée d'Orsay hold the plaster model. The model was made for a secret competition in 1880 for designs for the proposed monument to Victor Hugo in Paris, a commission which went to Barrias. A bronze of this sculpture was submitted to the Salon in 1897 and that bronze is now located in the Square de l'Opéra-Louis-Jouvet.  A smaller version of the work, 71 centimetres high, was cast in bronze by Thiébaut frères, Fumière et Gavignot.

 Vainqueur à la course

The Musée d'Orsay have an 1870 version of this Falguière composition and there is a bronze version in the Jardin des Tuileries in Paris.  The work was purchased from the Salon by the State in 1870 and in 1871 was exhibited at the Musée du Luxembourg. After being held in various locations it was finally taken into the Musée d'Orsay in 1986.

 Tarcisius, martyr chrétien

The Musée d'Orsay hold an 1868 marble version of this work.  The plaster model was purchased by the State from the Salon of 1867 and shown at the "l'Exposition Universelle" from 1867 to 1900.  It is held by the Musée des Augustins in Toulouse,.  A mask of Tarcisius is held by the Petit Palais in Paris and other plaster versions are held by Ny Carlsberg Glyptotek in Copenhagen as well as in Toulouse. There is a bronze version at the Detroit Institute of Arts.

Works outside of Paris

Works held by the Musée des Augustins in Toulouse

List of works
 "La Suisse accueille l'Armee francaise". 1874 Plaster work.
 "La Resistance". 1870 Statuette in terracotta.
 "La Musique". 1891 high-relief in plaster.
 "La Musique".1889 Work in plaster.
 "La Femme au paon". Work in marble. Dates to 1890.
 "La Femme au paon". Work in plaster.
 "Femme au phénix".  Bas-relief in bronze.
 "Baigneuse".  A Plaster statuette.
 "Caïn et Abel".  Work in terracotta.
 "Diane".  Head in terracotta.
 "Diane".  Head in terracotta.
 "Diane".  Marble statue 175 centimetres high.  This work was shown at the Salon in 1887.
 "Jean Abadie".  Marble bust.
 "L'Automne".  Marble statue.

Gallery

Images of villa "La Sapinière"

Works in churches

Public monuments outside France

Miscellaneous

References

Lists of sculptures